Black Raven is a German band established in 1992 by Julian Wiethoff (voice, guitar),  Zlatko Tudja (voice, guitar), Andy Tudja (percussion) and Torsten Leyhausen (bass guitar). Their first performance was in Neuss in 1993.

It is regarded as the first internationally successful so-called Teddy boy / revival-rock'n'roll band from Germany. In 1995, they had their first international performances in England, the mother-country of the rock'n'roll revival movement of the late 1970s and early 1980s. Notable at this time were their gigs at the Teddy Boy Weekender in Great Yarmouth and at the Blackpool Rock’n’Roll-Weekender.

Black Raven has appeared as a backing group for Graham Fenton of Matchbox, Sandy Ford of the Flying Saucers and to Freddie 'Fingers' Lee.

A highpoint of their German career was the 2004 Jägermeister Rockliga – a competition in which eighteen bands took part. Black Raven received third place and, as a result, was invited to perform in the 2005 Rock am Ring alongside Iron Maiden, Green Day, R.E.M., Mötley Crüe, Sonic Youth, The Hives, Slayer, Marilyn Manson, Mando Diao and Die Toten Hosen, a contemporary band from  Düsseldorf.

The band has been seen increasingly in other European countries particularly in Scandinavia and has appeared in 23 countries outside Germany including Japan, Russia and the USA.

Discography 
 Rock’n’Roll (EP, 1994)
 Raven's Break Up (LP, 1995)
 Fool's Paradise (EP, 1998)
 No Way To Stop Me - I'm On Rock’n’Roll (LP/CD, 2001)
 She's A Rocket (EP, 2004)
 Rock In Threes! (LP/CD, 2008)
 Rockbox Revival (LP/CD, 2018)

References

External links 
 
 Video on Youtube

Musical groups established in 1992
German rock music groups
Musical groups from Düsseldorf